Jean-Daniel Padovani (born 17 January 1980) is a French former footballer who played as a goalkeeper.

At the end of the 2007–08 season, he received the " Etoile d'Or du meilleur gardien de Ligue 2" (Gold star for the best Ligue 2 goalkeeper) from the magazine France Football.

Padovani was part of the Comoros national football team coaching team during the 2021 Africa Cup of Nations.

References

External links

1980 births
Living people
French people of Italian descent
French footballers
FC Martigues players
FC Rouen players
OGC Nice players
AS Cannes players
Angers SCO players
Dijon FCO players
Ligue 1 players
Ligue 2 players
Association football goalkeepers